Hawaiian honeycreepers are a group of small, passerine birds endemic to Hawaii. They are closely related to the rosefinches in the genus Carpodacus, but many species have evolved features unlike those present in any other finch. Their great morphological diversity is the result of adaptive radiation in an insular environment. Many have been driven to extinction since the first humans arrived in Hawaii, with extinctions increasing over the last 2 centuries following European discovery of the islands, with habitat destruction and especially invasive species being the main causes.

Taxonomy 
Before the introduction of molecular phylogenetic techniques, the relationship of the Hawaiian honeycreepers to other bird species was controversial. The honeycreepers were sometimes categorized as a family Drepanididae, other authorities considered them a subfamily, Drepanidinae, of Fringillidae, the finch family.  The entire group was also called Drepanidini in treatments where buntings and American sparrows (Passerellidae) were included in the finch family; this term is preferred for just one subgroup of the birds today.  Most recently, the entire group has been subsumed into the finch subfamily Carduelinae.

The Hawaiian honeycreepers are the sister taxon to the Carpodacus rosefinches. Their ancestors are thought to have been from Asia and diverged from Carpodacus about 7.2 million years ago, and they are thought to have first arrived and radiated on the Hawaiian Islands between 5.7-7.2 million years ago, which was roughly the same time that the islands of Ni'ihau and Kauai formed. The lineage of the recently extinct po'ouli (Melamprosops) was the most ancient of the Hawaiian honeycreeper lineages to survive to recent times, diverging about 5.7-5.8 million years ago. The lineage containing Oreomystis and Paroreomyza was the second to diverge, diverging about a million years after the po'ouli's lineage. Most of the other lineages with highly distinctive morphologies are thought to have originated in the mid-late Pliocene, after the formation of Oahu but prior to the formation of Maui. Due to this, Oahu likely played a key role in the formation of diverse morphologies among honeycreepers, allowing for cycles of colonization and speciation between Kauai and Oahu.

A phylogenetic tree of the recent Hawaiian honeycreeper lineages is shown here. Genera or clades with question marks (?) are of controversial or uncertain taxonomic placement.
{{Clade|{{clade
|1={{clade
     |1=Melamprosops (the extinct poʻouli)
     |2=
}}
}}}}

The classification of Paroreomyza and Oreomystis as sister genera and forming the second most basal group is based on genetic and molecular evidence, and has been affirmed by numerous studies; however, when morphological evidence only is used, Paroreomyza is instead the second most basal genus, with Oreomystis being the third most basal genus and more closely allied with the derived Hawaiian honeycreepers, as Oreomystis shares traits with the derived honeycreepers, such as a squared-off tongue and a distinct musty odor, that Paroreomyza does not. This does not align with the genetic evidence supporting Paroreomyza and Oreomystis as sister genera, and it would be seemingly impossible for only Paroreomyza to have lost the distinctive traits but Oreomystis and all core honeycreepers to have retained or convergently evolved them, thus presenting a taxonomic conundrum.Viridonia (containing the greater ʻamakihi) may be associated with or even synonymous with the genus Aidemedia (containing the prehistoric icterid-like and sickle-billed gapers), and has the most debated taxonomy; it was long classified within the "greater Hemignathus" radiation (a now-paraphyletic grouping containing species formerly lumped within Hemignathus, including Hemignathus, Akialoa, and Chlorodrepanis) and while some sources speculate it as being sister to Chlorodrepanis (containing the lesser ʻamakihis), other sources speculate it may be a sister genus to the genus Loxops (containing the 'akepas, ʻakekeʻe and ʻalawī).

Characteristics
Nearly all species of Hawaiian honeycreepers have been noted as having a unique odor to their plumage, described by many researchers as "rather like that of old canvas tents".

Today, the flowers of the native ōhia (Metrosideros polymorpha) are favored by a number of nectarivorous honeycreepers.  The wide range of bill shapes in this group, from thick, finch-like bills to slender, down-curved bills for probing flowers have arisen through adaptive radiation, where an ancestral finch has evolved to fill a large number of ecological niches. Some 20 species of Hawaiian honeycreeper have become extinct in the recent past, and many more in earlier times, following the arrival of humans who introduced non-native animals (ex: rats, pigs, goats, cows) and converted habitat for agriculture.

Genera and species
The term "prehistoric" indicates species that became extinct between the initial human settlement of Hawaii (i.e., from the late 1st millennium AD on) and European contact in 1778.

Subfamily CarduelinaeDrepanidini
Genus Aidemedia Olson & James, 1991 – straight thin bills, insectivoresAidemedia chascax Olson & James, 1991 – Oahu icterid-like gaper (prehistoric)Aidemedia lutetiae Olson & James, 1991 – Maui Nui icterid-like gaper (prehistoric)Aidemedia zanclops Olson & James, 1991 – sickle-billed gaper (prehistoric)
Genus Akialoa Olson & James, 1995 – pointed, long and down-curved bills, insectivorous or nectarivorousAkialoa ellisiana Gray, 1859 – Oʻahu ʻakialoa (extinct, 1940)Akialoa lanaiensis Rothschild, 1893 – Maui Nui ʻakialoa (extinct, 1892)Akialoa stejnegeri Wilson, 1889 – Kauaʻi ʻakialoa (extinct, 1969)Akialoa obscura Cabanis, 1889 – lesser ʻakialoa (extinct, 1940)Akialoa upupirostris – hoopoe-billed ʻakialoa (prehistoric)
Genus Chloridops Wilson, 1888 – thick-billed, hard seed (e.g. Myoporum sandwicense) specialist Chloridops kona Wilson, 1888 – Kona grosbeak (extinct, 1894)Chloridops regiskongi – King Kong grosbeak (prehistoric)Chloridops wahi – wahi grosbeak (prehistoric)
Genus Chlorodrepanis Olson & James, 1995 – pointed bills, insectivorous and nectarivorousChlorodrepanis stejnegeri Pratt, 1989 – Kauaʻi ʻamakihiChlorodrepanis flava Bloxam, 1827 – Oʻahu ʻamakihiChlorodrepanis virens Cabanis, 1851 – Hawaiʻi ʻamakihi
Genus Ciridops Newton, 1892 – finch-like, fed on fruit of Pritchardia speciesCiridops anna Dole, 1879 – ʻula-ʻai-hāwane (extinct, 1892 or 1937)Ciridops tenax Olson & James, 1991 stout-legged finch (prehistoric)
 Genus Drepanis Temminck, 1820 – down-curved bills, nectarivoresDrepanis funerea Newton, 1894 – black mamo (extinct, 1907)Drepanis pacifica Gmelin, 1788 – Hawaiʻi mamo  (extinct, 1898)Drepanis coccinea Forster, 1780 – ʻiʻiwi
 Genus Dysmorodrepanis Perkins, 1919 – pincer-like bill, possibly snail specialistDysmorodrepanis munroi Perkins, 1919 – Lanaʻi hookbill (extinct, 1918)
Genus Hemignathus Lichtenstein, 1839 – pointed or long and down-curved bills, insectivorousHemignathus affinis – Maui nukupuʻu (extinct, 1995–1998)Hemignathus hanapepe – Kauaʻi nukupuʻu (extinct, 1998)Hemignathus lucidus – Oʻahu nukupuʻu (extinct, 1837)Hemignathus vorpalis James & Olson, 2003 – giant nukupu'u (prehistoric)Hemignathus wilsoni Rothschild, 1893 – ʻakiapolaʻau
Genus Himatione  – thin-billed, nectarivorousHimatione sanguinea Gmelin, 1788 – ʻapapaneHimatione fraithii – Laysan honeycreeper (extinct, 1923)
 Genus Loxioides Oustalet, 1877 – finch-like, Fabales seed specialistsLoxioides bailleui Oustalet, 1877 – palilaLoxioides kikuichi Olson & James, 2006 – Kaua'i palila (prehistoric, possibly survived to the early 18th century)
Genus Loxops – small pointed bills with the tips slightly crossed, insectivorousLoxops caeruleirostris Wilson, 1890 – ‘akeke‘eLoxops coccineus Gmelin, 1789 – Hawaiʻi ʻakepaLoxops ochraceus Rothschild, 1893 - Maui ʻakepa (extinct, 1988)Loxops wolstenholmei Rothschild, 1895 – Oʻahu ʻakepa (extinct, 1990s)Loxops mana Wilson, 1891 – Hawaiʻi creeper
Genus Magumma - small pointed bills, insectivorous and nectarivorousMagumma parva Stejneger, 1887 - ʻanianiau
Genus Melamprosops Casey & Jacobi, 1974 – short pointed bill, insectivorous and snail specialistMelamprosops phaeosoma Casey & Jacobi, 1974 – poʻouli (extinct, 2004)
 Genus Oreomystis Wilson, 1891 – short pointed bills, insectivorousOreomystis bairdi Stejneger, 1887 – ʻakikiki
Genus Orthiospiza – large weak bill, possibly soft seed or fruit specialist?Orthiospiza howarthi James & Olson, 1991 - highland finch (prehistoric)
Genus Palmeria Rothschild, 1893 – thin-billed, nectarivorous, favors Metrosideros polymorphaPalmeria dolei Wilson, 1891 – ʻakohekohe 
Genus Paroreomyza – short pointed bills, insectivorousParoreomyza maculata Cabanis, 1850 – Oʻahu ʻalauahio (possibly extinct, early 1990s?)Paroreomyza flammea (Wilson, 1889) – kākāwahie (extinct, 1963)Paroreomyza Paroreomyza  Wilson, 1890 – Lana'i 'alauahio (extinct, 1937)Paroreomyza  newtoni (Rothschild, 1893)  – Maui ‘alauahio
Genus Pseudonestor – parrot-like bill, probes wood for insect larvaePseudonestor xanthophrys Rothschild, 1893 – Maui parrotbill or kiwikiu
Genus Psittirostra – slightly hooked bill, Freycinetia arborea fruit specialistPsittirostra psittacea Gmelin, 1789 – ʻōʻū (probably extinct, 1998?)
Genus Rhodacanthis – large-billed, granivorous, legume specialistsRhodacanthis flaviceps Rothschild, 1892 – lesser koa-finch (extinct, 1891)Rhodacanthis forfex James & Olson, 2005 – scissor-billed koa-finch (prehistoric)Rhodacanthis litotes James & Olson, 2005 – primitive koa-finch (prehistoric)Rhodacanthis palmeri Rothschild, 1892 – greater koa-finch (extinct, 1896)
Genus Telespiza Wilson, 1890 – finch-like, granivorous, opportunistic scavengersTelespiza cantans Wilson, 1890 – Laysan finchTelespiza persecutrix James & Olson, 1991 – Kauaʻi finch (prehistoric)Telespiza ultima Bryan, 1917 – Nihoa finchTelespiza ypsilon James & Olson, 1991 – Maui Nui finch (prehistoric)
Genus Vangulifer – flat rounded bills, possibly caught flying insectsVangulifer mirandus – strange-billed finch (prehistoric)Vangulifer neophasis – thin-billed finch (prehistoric)
Genus Viridonia Viridonia sagittirostris Rothschild, 1892 – greater ʻamakihi (extinct, 1901)
 Genus Xestospiza James & Oslon, 1991 – cone-shaped bills, possibly insectivorousXestospiza conica James & Olson, 1991 – cone-billed finch (prehistoric)Xestospiza fastigialis'' James & Olson, 1991 – ridge-billed finch (prehistoric)

Hawaiian honeycreepers were formerly classified into three tribes – Hemignathini, Psittirostrini, and Drepanidini – but they are not currently classified as such.

See also
Hawaiian honeycreeper conservation
List of adaptive radiated Hawaiian honeycreepers by form

Cited references

Other references
Groth, J. G. 1998. Molecular phylogeny of the cardueline finches and Hawaiian honeycreepers. Ostrich, 69: 401.

External links
 Hawaiian Honeycreepers (Drepanididae) information, including 4 species with videos and 11 with photographs at the Internet Bird Collection

 
 
Bird common names
Carduelinae